County Road 507 or County Route 507 may refer to:

 County Road 507 (Brevard County, Florida)
 County Route 507 (New Jersey)